Larry Hans Maxie (born October 10, 1940) is a retired American professional baseball player and scout. During his on-field career he was a right-handed pitcher who appeared in two games in the Major Leagues for the Atlanta Braves on August 30 and 31, 1969. However, Maxie's pitching career extended for 15 seasons (1958–1972), all in the Braves' organization.

He attended Chaffey High School and then signed with the Braves when they were still based in Milwaukee and reached the Triple-A level in 1961. But he would be in his 12th year in the Brave organization when he finally made his MLB debut in 1969, working on successive days as a relief pitcher against the Chicago Cubs at Atlanta Fulton County Stadium. In three full innings pitched, he allowed one earned run on one hit (a double by Don Kessinger). He issued one base on balls and struck out one (Randy Hundley). He threw two wild pitches. He was on Atlanta's postseason roster for the 1969 National League Championship Series versus the New York Mets, but did not play.

In the minors, Maxie won 125 games. He continued his baseball career as a longtime scout for the Braves and other MLB teams.

References

External links
, or Retrosheet, or Pura Pelota

1940 births
Living people
Atlanta Braves players
Atlanta Braves scouts
Atlanta Crackers players
Austin Senators players
Baseball players from California
Cardenales de Lara players
American expatriate baseball players in Venezuela
Cedar Rapids Braves players
Chicago Cubs scouts
Chicago White Sox scouts
Denver Bears players
Eau Claire Braves players
Jacksonville Braves players
Louisville Colonels (minor league) players
Major League Baseball pitchers
People from Upland, California
Philadelphia Phillies scouts
Richmond Braves players
Savannah Braves players
Tigres de Aragua players
Toronto Blue Jays scouts
Toronto Maple Leafs (International League) players